Max Gordon Showalter (June 2, 1917 – July 30, 2000), sometimes credited as Casey Adams, was an American film, television, and stage actor, as well as a composer, pianist, and singer. He appeared on more than 1,000 television programs. One of Showalter's memorable roles was as the husband of Jean Peters' character in the 1953 film Niagara.

Early life
Showalter was born in Caldwell, Kansas, the son of Elma Roxanna (Dodson) Showalter (1889–1953), a music teacher, and Ira Edward Showalter (1887–1953), who worked in the oil industry and was also a banker and farmer. As a toddler, he developed a desire for acting while accompanying his mother to local theatres where she played piano for silent movies. He served in the Army in World War II as an entertainer.

Stage
By the late 1930s, Showalter had multiple stage roles under his belt, including acting in productions of the Pasadena Playhouse. He soon made his Broadway debut in Knights of Song. Showalter also appeared in the traveling musical This Is the Army for two years and in other notable Broadway productions like Make Mine Manhattan and The Grass Harp. His most memorable stage role was as Horace Vandergelder in the Broadway hit show, Hello Dolly!. Showalter performed the role more than 3,000 times opposite Carol Channing, Betty Grable, and Ethel Merman.

Motion pictures and television
In the late 1940s, Showalter was signed to 20th Century Fox as a featured contract player. His name was changed by Fox's founder, Darryl F. Zanuck, to the more "bankable" Casey Adams.

He made his feature film debut in Always Leave Them Laughing (1949). He first appeared on live television in the short-lived musical variety series The Swift Show (1948–49), also known as The Lanny Ross Show.

Showalter's second feature film was the biopic With a Song in My Heart (1952), where he had a small role as a vaudeville performer. In the film, Showalter, along with David Wayne, sang the song "Hoe that Corn", which he also wrote. He appeared in Niagara (1953) alongside Marilyn Monroe and Joseph Cotten. He made a cameo as a Life magazine photographer in another Monroe movie, Bus Stop, in 1956.

During the 1950s, Showalter appeared in television shows like The Loretta Young Show and Navy Log, in addition to films like Vicki (1953), Down Three Dark Streets (1954), Naked Alibi (1954), Indestructible Man (1956) and  Gunsmoke (1957) as "Barney Wales", the new husband of the title character "Mavis McCloud" (S3E7).

The following year, billed as Casey Adams, he appeared as Ward Cleaver in "It's a Small World", the original pilot for the 1950s sitcom Leave It to Beaver. The pilot was broadcast as an episode of the Studio 57 anthology series. He was replaced by Hugh Beaumont for the television series. Casey Adams also appeared in The Andy Griffith Show as antiques dealer Ralph Mason in the episode titled "The Horse Trader."

In the 1960s, Showalter reclaimed his original name and continued to land roles in such big-budget films as Elmer Gantry (1960), The Music Man (1962), and How to Murder Your Wife (1965). He worked through the 1960s and 1970s. He made six appearances on Perry Mason, including the role of murderer Carl Reynolds in the 1958 episode, "The Case of the Curious Bride," murder victim Burt Stokes in "The Case of the Wandering Widow" in 1960, and murderer Talbot Sparr in the 1964 episode, "The Case of the Ugly Duckling." He made appearances in other television series like The Twilight Zone (the iconic episode "It's a Good Life"), The Lucy Show, Gunsmoke, The Many Loves of Dobie Gillis, The New Phil Silvers Show, Bewitched, Dr. Kildare, Surfside 6, The Doris Day Show, Kojak, Police Story, The Bob Newhart Show, as well as in cult films, Lord Love a Duck, The Anderson Tapes and Sgt. Pepper's Lonely Hearts Club Band.  In the 1979 film 10, he famously played a pastor whose hobby was writing (bad) songs.  He was also a regular cast member in the short-lived 1980 TV series, The Stockard Channing Show.  Showalter made his last onscreen appearance in the John Hughes film Sixteen Candles (1984).

Composing
Showalter composed the music for Little Boy Blue, which opened at the El Capitan Theater in Hollywood, California, on September 11, 1950. He also wrote the musical Go for Your Gun, which premiered in Manchester, England, in 1963.

Recording
In 1956, Showalter (as Casey Adams) recorded an album of his own music, Casey Adams Plays and Sings Max Showalter Songs (Foremost Records FML-1004). He was one of the artists featured on The Secret Garden, a 1988 CBS Special Products album containing performances of music from the musical of that title that "has played the repertory circuit in England."

Painting
Show business columnist Hedda Hopper reported in a 1963 newspaper column that Showalter had sold 139 paintings and would have his first one-man show.

Later years
In 1984, Showalter retired from acting and moved to an 18th-century farmhouse in Chester, Connecticut, near the area where he acted in the film, It Happened to Jane (1959). Showalter became involved in local musical theatre, including the Ivoryton Playhouse, and went on to produce, direct, write, and narrate the Christmas musical Touch of a Child. He spent much of his free time painting oil miniatures. Showalter was a good friend of actress Katharine Hepburn, who lived in nearby Old Saybrook, Connecticut.

Personal life
In the 1950s, Showalter took a hiatus from his work in Hollywood, returning to Caldwell, Kansas, to care for his 15-year-old sister who was orphaned by the death of their parents in an automobile accident. Their deaths followed the death of Showalter's brother, Robert, in a car wreck two years earlier. After a few years he returned to Hollywood and resumed his career.

Death
On July 30, 2000, Max Showalter died of cancer in Middletown, Connecticut. He was 83 years old.

Filmography

 Always Leave Them Laughing (1949) as Comet Pen Salesman
 With a Song in My Heart (1952) as Harry Guild
 What Price Glory? (1952) as Lt. Moore 
 My Wife's Best Friend (1952) as Pete Bentham 
 Stars and Stripes Forever (1952) as Narrator (voice, uncredited)
 Niagara (1953) as Ray Cutler  
 Destination Gobi (1953) as Walter Landers
 Vicki (1953) as Larry Evans 
 Dangerous Crossing (1953) as Jim Logan
 Night People (1954) as Frederick S. Hobart
 Down Three Dark Streets (1954) as Dave Millson 
 Naked Alibi (1954) as Det. Lt. Fred Parks
 The Return of Jack Slade (1955) as Billy Wilcox
 Never Say Goodbye (1956) as Andy Leonard
 Indestructible Man (1956) as Police Lt. Dick Chasen 
 Somebody Up There Likes Me (1956) (uncredited)
 Bus Stop (1956) as Life Magazine Reporter
 Dragoon Wells Massacre (1957) as Phillip Scott 
 Designing Woman (1957) as musical director (uncredited)
 The Monster That Challenged the World (1957) as Dr. Tad Johns 
 Hellcats of the Navy (1957) (uncredited)
 The Female Animal (1958) as Charlie Grant
 The Naked and the Dead (1958) as Col. Dalleson 
 Voice in the Mirror (1958) as Don Martin 

 It Happened to Jane (1959) as Selwyn Harris 
 Elmer Gantry (1960) as Deaf Man (uncredited)
 Return to Peyton Place (1961) as Nick Parker (uncredited)
 Claudelle Inglish (1961) as Young Parson (uncredited)
 Summer and Smoke (1961) as Roger Doremus 
 Bon Voyage! (1962) as The Tight Suit
 The Music Man (1962) as Salesman on the Train (uncredited)
 Smog (1962) as Paul Prescott
 My Six Loves (1963) as B.J. Smith
 Move Over, Darling (1963) as Hotel Desk Clerk
 Mr. and Mrs. (1964) as Walter
 Fate Is the Hunter (1964) as Dan Crawford
 Sex and the Single Girl (1964) as Holmes
 How to Murder Your Wife (1965) as Tobey Rawlins
 Lord Love a Duck (1966) as Howard Greene
 A Talent for Loving (1969) as Franklin
 The Moonshine War (1970) as Mr. Worthman
 The Anderson Tapes (1971) as Bingham
 Bonnie's Kids (1973) as Frank
 Sgt. Pepper's Lonely Hearts Club Band (1978) as Ernest Shears
 10 (1979) as Reverend
 Racing with the Moon (1984) as Mr. Arthur, Piano Teacher
 Sixteen Candles (1984) as Fred (final film role)

Television

 The Swift Show (1948–1949) as Regular (1949)
 TV Reader's Digest (1 episode, 1954)
 The Loretta Young Show (4 episodes, 1954–1955)
 The Return of Jack Slade (1955)
 The 20th Century Fox Hour (1 episode, 1956) as Barry
 Navy Log (1 episode, 1956) as Lieutenant Sloane
 Matinee Theatre (1 episode, 1956)
 Star Stage (1 episode, 1956) as Pete
 The Gale Storm Show (1956) as Orchestra Leader
 Crossroads (1 episode, 1956) as Deavers / Bannister
 Hawkeye and the Last of the Mohicans (1 episode, 1957) as Capt. John West
 Leave It to Beaver (1 episode, 1957) as Ward Cleaver
 Code 3 (1 episode, 1957)
 Gunsmoke (1 episode, 1957) as Barney Wales
 Mr. Adams and Eve (1 episode, 1958) as Dovey
 General Electric Theater (2 episode, 1959–1962) as Joe Malone / Will Henderson
 The Thin Man (1 episode, 1959) as Paul Cameron
 The David Niven Show (1 episode, 1959) as Big Guy
 The Andy Griffith Show (1 episode, 1961) as Ralph Mason
 Stagecoach West (1 episode, 1961) as David Harkness
 Follow the Sun (1 episode, 1961) as Don Hinkley

 The Twilight Zone (1 episode, 1961) as Pat Riley
 Surfside 6 (1 episode, 1962) as Ned Martin
 Sam Benedict (1 episode, 1963) as John Buchanan
 Dr. Kildare (2 episodes, 1962–1964) as Rulon Murphy / Ben Ballard
 Hazel (1 episode, 1963) as Mr. Blackpool
 The New Phil Silvers Show (1 episode, 1963) as Frank
 The Lucy Show (1 episode, 1964) as Vinnie / Vinnie Meyers
 Perry Mason (6 episodes, 1958–1965) as Charles Judd / Talbot Sparr / Clarence Henry / Frank Logan / Burt Stokes / Carl Reynolds 
 Bewitched (1 episode, 1965) as Charles Barlow
 The Doris Day Show (1 episode, 1969) as Greg Fletcher
 Police Story (1 episode, 1975) as Attorney John Barron
 How to Succeed in Business Without Really Trying (1975) as J. B. Biggley
 Kojak (1 episode, 1975) as Quinlan
 The Bob Newhart Show (1 episode, 1977) as Dr. Morgan
 Quincy M.E. (1 episode, 1978) as Dr. Milton Gold
 The Stockard Channing Show (11 episodes, 1980) as Gus Clyde
 The Incredible Hulk (1 episodes, 1980) as Walter Gamble
 The Love Boat (2 episodes, 1982–1983) as Jarvis Holden / Herman Baker

References

External links

  
  
 

1917 births
2000 deaths
People from Caldwell, Kansas
Military personnel from Kansas
Male actors from Kansas
American male television actors
American male film actors
American male musical theatre actors
American male stage actors
United States Army personnel of World War II
People from Chester, Connecticut
Deaths from cancer in Connecticut
20th-century American male actors
20th-century American singers
20th-century American male singers